Mouna Ragam is a 1986 film.

Mouna Ragam (alternatively Mounaragam, Mounaraagam or Mouna Raagam) may refer to:

 Mouna Raagam (TV series), a 2017 TV series
 Mounaraagam (Telugu TV series), a 2018 TV series
 Mounaragam, a 2019 TV series
 Mouna Raagam 2, a 2021 TV series